Tomáš Duba (born July 2, 1981 in Prague, Czechoslovakia) is a retired Czech professional ice hockey goaltender, who last played for Sheffield Steelers in the British Elite Ice Hockey League (EIHL).

Playing career
Whilst with HC Sparta Praha as a youth, Duba was drafted in the seventh round of the NHL, 217th overall, by the Pittsburgh Penguins in the 2001 NHL Entry Draft.

After playing with Ässät of the Finnish SM-liiga, Duba returned on May 1, 2009, back to his native Czech Republic and signed with HC Oceláři Třinec.

On January 20, 2013, Duba left Bolzano HC and signed for the remainder of the 2012–13 season, with Krefeld Pinguine of the German DEL. He then stayed with the Krefeld team through the 2015-16 season. In April 2016, he inked with EC KAC of the Austrian league EBEL.

In August 2019, Duba moved to UK EIHL side Sheffield Steelers. Duba quickly won admiration among Steelers fans, becoming something of a cult figure for his seemingly perennial smile, and, on 8 March 2020, he was part of the Sheffield Steelers team that won the 2020 Challenge Cup with a 4-3 victory over the Cardiff Devils.

In November 2020, Duba hung up his skates - becoming the goaltending coach for Finnish side PEPO.

International play
Duba appeared for the Czech national junior team (Under 20) in the 2000 Junior World Championships and 2001 Junior World Championships in Sweden and Moscow respectively. In 2001 Championships he won an award for the best goalie, while playing for SaiPa in Finland's SM-liiga. After this date, he has played for the Czech national team.

References

External links

Tomáš Duba at the official HC Sparta Praha website

1981 births
Living people
Ässät players
HC Berounští Medvědi players
Bolzano HC players
Czech ice hockey goaltenders
High1 players
EC KAC players
Krefeld Pinguine players
Leksands IF players
HC Lev Poprad players
HC Oceláři Třinec players
Orli Znojmo players
Piráti Chomutov players
Pittsburgh Penguins draft picks
HC Plzeň players
SaiPa players
Sheffield Steelers players
HC Sparta Praha players
HC TPS players
PSG Berani Zlín players
Ice hockey people from Prague
Czech expatriate ice hockey players in Finland
Czech expatriate ice hockey players in Slovakia
Czech expatriate ice hockey players in Sweden
Czech expatriate ice hockey players in Germany
Czech expatriate sportspeople in South Korea
Czech expatriate sportspeople in England
Czech expatriate sportspeople in Italy
Czech expatriate sportspeople in Austria
Expatriate ice hockey players in England
Expatriate ice hockey players in Austria
Expatriate ice hockey players in Italy
Expatriate ice hockey players in South Korea